Irunkōvēl, also known as Irungkōvēl, Irukkuvēl, and Ilangōvēlir, was a title of the Irunkōvēl line of Velir kings. The Irunkovel line of kings ruled over Konadu identified with the Kodumbalur and surrounding areas in ancient Tamilakkam. They trace their lineage to the clan of Krishna; one of the inscriptions at Kodumbalur belonging to one of the kings in the Irunkovel line, namely Tennavan Irunkōvēl, declares that he belonged to the kshatriya dynasty which is descended from Yadu (legendary king). The Moovar Koil record of Irukkuvel chief Boothi Vikramakesari lauds his father, Samarabirama, as Yadu-vamsa-ketu (Banner of the Yadu race).

The contemporary of Karikala
The most famous among them was a contemporary of Karikala Chola as well as poet Kapilar and lived during the Sangam era. Sangam literature mentions a chieftain called Irunkovel who could trace his lineage back over 49 generations to residence in Dvārakā. He is later defeated by Karikala and becomes a subordinate to the Chola sovereign.

Irungola Cholas 

The Irungovel chieftains were not merely feudatories but were related to the Cholas through  matrimony. The Cholas considered the offspring of these unions as one of their own and referred to them as Pillai meaning child or son in their epigraphs. These princes assumed both the Chola and Irungovel titles like for example there was one Adavallan Gangaikonda Cholan alias Irungolan during the time of Kulottunga I and then there was a certain Sendamangalam Udaiyan Araiyan Edirili Cholan alias Irungolan during the reign of Kulottunga III.

References
Citations

Bibliography

Historical heritage of the Tamils By Ca. Vē Cuppiramaṇiyan̲, Ka. Ta Tirunāvukkaracu, International Institute of Tamil Studies
Studies in Indian epigraphy, Volume 32 By Epigraphical Society of India

Further reading

Tamil monarchs